Subterranean warfare is warfare carried out under the ground surface.

Overview

Underground military facilities play a key role in many nations, there are more than 10,000 underground military facilities worldwide, as such underground warfare is a nearly inevitable component of modern conflicts. Actors often go underground to counteract overmatch such as that faced when taking on a superpower.

History

Subterranean warfare was occasionally carried out during World War II. Examples are the defense of the Adzhimushkay quarry, or the use of Odessa Catacombs during guerilla warfare by Soviet partisans.

In 21st century the issue of readiness to subterranean warfare was raised before the U.S. military in view of the tunnel tactic of Hamas. A December 11, 2013 RFI (request for information) titled "Technologies to enhance warfighter capabilities in subterranean environments" states in part:
In an effort to defeat United States (US) intelligence and weapons technologies and to gain tactical and operational advantages both Military and irregular threats have begun relocating, and redeploying functions into subterranean operational environments (SbT OE). The growing use of tunnels and underground facilities (UGF) by military and irregular forces to gain a tactical advantage is becoming more sophisticated and increasingly effective, making the likelihood of US Forces encountering military-purposed subterranean structures on future battlefields high. The Middle East is full of ancient and modern underground systems that can be used as assets for the enemy forces. In the US, both the northern and southern borders of the nation have had tunnels discovered connecting the US to Canada and Mexico being used by criminal elements for human smuggling, drug running, and other illegal activities. 

Director Robert Ashley of the Defense Intelligence Agency stated in 2018 that the Department of Defense is considering making "underground" a new domain, in anticipation of a future increasing in urban warfare.

See also
 Trench warfare
 Tunnel warfare
 Underground construction
 Military engineering

References